The 1956–57 Romanian Hockey League season was the 27th season of the Romanian Hockey League. Four teams participated in the league, and Recolta Miercurea Ciuc won the championship.

Regular season

External links
hochei.net

Rom
Romanian Hockey League seasons
1956–57 in Romanian ice hockey